Herning Messecenter station is a railway halt in the western part of the city of Herning in Jutland, Denmark. The station serves the exhibition centre and entertainment complex of Messecenter Herning in the western part of Herning.

Herning Messecenter railway halt is located on the Skanderborg–Skjern line, and opened in 1997. It offers direct regional train services to Herning, Aarhus, and Skjern operated by Arriva.

See also
List of railway stations in Denmark

References

Citations

Bibliography

External links

 Banedanmark – government agency responsible for maintenance and traffic control of most of the Danish railway network
 Arriva – British multinational public transport company operating bus and train services in Denmark
 Danske Jernbaner – website with information on railway history in Denmark

Railway stations opened in 1997
Railway stations in the Central Denmark Region
Railway stations in Denmark opened in the 20th century